Marie Herbst (May 26, 1928 – April 23, 2015) was an American politician who was Mayor of Vernon, Connecticut (1979–1986) and a member of the Connecticut Senate (1987–1992). Herbst was a Democrat.

References

|-

1928 births
2015 deaths
People from Vernon, Connecticut
Mayors of places in Connecticut
Women state legislators in Connecticut
Democratic Party Connecticut state senators
Women mayors of places in Connecticut
21st-century American women